Jung Chan-sung (born March 17, 1987), anglicized as Chan Sung Jung and better known by his ring name The Korean Zombie, is a South Korean professional mixed martial artist. He currently competes in the Featherweight division of the Ultimate Fighting Championship (UFC). A professional competitor since 2007, Jung formerly fought for the WEC, Pancrase, World Victory Road, and DEEP. His nickname, The Korean Zombie, comes from his zombie-like ability to continue to move forward and fight aggressively, even after taking heavy blows. As of November 8, 2022, he is #6 in the UFC featherweight rankings.

Background
Born in Pohang, South Korea in 1987, Jung moved to Namyangju, a satellite city of Seoul when he was in his mid-teens. Due to his slight stature and his rural origins, he was bullied constantly by his classmates and got into many fights as a result. When his aunt could no longer stand to see Jung's predicament, she took him to a nearby Hapkido gym when he was around 14 years old. Jung trained in kickboxing until his junior year of high school. He graduated from Daegu Gyeongbuk Institute of Science and Technology. Later he also began training in judo and Brazilian jiu jitsu.

At the age of 18, Jung joined the South Korean Navy and started training in Taekwondo. In June 2007, he won a sambo tournament arranged by the Korean Sambo Association, and in December of the same year, he won the Lightweight division of the Pancrase Korea Neo-Blood Tournament after defeating fellow South Koreans Yoo In Seok and Lee Hyung Geol. At age of 20, Jung began mixed martial arts and made his professional debut soon after. In May 2008, he participated in and won KOREA-FC's 8-man MMA tournament in the 65 kg division.
Jung was also a participant in a show called Street Fighter in 2007 which aired on South Korean cable television. He participated in the 70 kg tournament and won. The tournament was stand-up only (similar to K-1 but not in a ring).

Mixed martial arts career

Early career
Jung made his professional debut in June 2007 and in December the same year, he won a Lightweight Tournament arranged by Pancrase Korea. In 2008 he won both his fights for Japanese promotion DEEP. He then entered the 2009 Sengoku Featherweight Grand Prix where he won his first-round fight but was eliminated from the tournament by the eventual winner Masanori Kanehara.

On August 16, 2008, he defeated Michihiro Omigawa at DEEP: Gladiator via unanimous decision. His next fight was against Fanjin Son at DEEP: 39 Impact where he won via knockout in 17 seconds.

Sengoku
Jung then entered the 2009 Sengoku Featherweight Grand-Prix and was matched up with Shintaro Ishiwatari in his first-round fight at Sengoku 7. After dropping Ishiwatari once in stand-up striking, Jung hit Ishiwatari with a right hand forcing him to give up his back. From there Jung sunk in a rear-naked choke submission forcing Ishiwatari to submit at 4:29 of the first round.

In his second-round fight at Sengoku 8 on May 2, 2009, he lost via unanimous decision to Masanori Kanehara officially eliminating him from the tournament. The decision was considered questionable by the English commentators and many fans (especially given Sengoku's history of biased decisions against Korean fighters), who felt that Jung had done enough to deserve the decision. On June 7, 2009, it was announced Jung would face American Matt Jaggers at Sengoku 9 in a reserve bout for the tournament with the winner stepping in as a replacement should some of the remaining fighters be unable to continue. Jung ended up winning the fight by triangle choke submission at 1:25 of the second round, but was not required to step in as a replacement.

World Extreme Cagefighting
Chan Sung Jung then signed with World Extreme Cagefighting. He made his American and WEC debut against Leonard Garcia (who replaced injured opponent Cub Swanson) on April 24, 2010 at WEC 48 losing by an extremely controversial split decision. Many MMA publications and fans (including many in the Sacramento home crowd) opposed the decision, which has led again to questions about the accuracy of the fight judging. However, the bout was awarded the Fight of the Night honors, this was later declared the Fight of the Year by the Wrestling Observer Newsletter.

Jung next faced George Roop on September 30, 2010, at WEC 51. He lost the fight via knockout due to a head kick in the second round.

Ultimate Fighting Championship
Jung was expected to face Rani Yahya on January 22, 2011, at UFC Fight Night 23. However, Jung was forced from the card with an injury.

A rematch with Garcia was scheduled for March 26, 2011, at UFC Fight Night 24, after Jung stepped in to replace an injured Nam Phan. Jung was able to avenge the original loss after submitting Garcia with a twister in the final second of the second round. This was the first time in the history of the UFC that a twister submission finished an opponent and the win earned Jung his first Submission of the Night honors. This was later awarded for the Submission of the Year by the World MMA Awards. In his post-fight interview, Jung stated he learned the move by watching Eddie Bravo videos on YouTube.

Jung faced former title challenger Mark Hominick on December 10, 2011, at UFC 140. Jung won the bout via KO at seven seconds of the first round, which tied a UFC record for the fastest knockout at the time. Jung's victory over Mark Hominick earned him Knockout of the Night honors.  The victory also earned Jung much praise in his native South Korea, appearing on news broadcasts on the country's major national television channels (such as KBS).

Jung faced Dustin Poirier on May 15, 2012, at UFC on Fuel TV: Korean Zombie vs. Poirier. Jung defeated Poirier via submission in the fourth round. The performance earned Jung Submission of the Night and both participants Fight of the Night honors. The bout was honored as Fight of the Year and Submission of the Year by several publications at the conclusion of 2012. This fight was the first time that Jung walked out to the incredibly popular and appropriately named song; Zombie by The Cranberries. He would use this for every fight thereafter. 

Jung was expected to face Ricardo Lamas on July 6, 2013, at UFC 162. However, on June 14, it was announced that Jung had been pulled from the Lamas bout and would replace an injured Anthony Pettis to face José Aldo for the UFC Featherweight Championship on August 3, 2013, at UFC 163. Aldo defeated Jung via fourth-round TKO, finishing Jung with a flurry of strikes after Jung suffered a dislocated shoulder while throwing an overhand right.

Jung was expected to face Akira Corassani on October 4, 2014, at UFC Fight Night 53. However, Jung pulled out of the bout citing another injury and was replaced by Max Holloway.

Jung announced in mid-October 2014 his intention to begin his stint for mandatory military service in his home country of South Korea. While Jung did not comment about the future upon his completion, his manager indicated that he would return to mixed martial arts at the end of the two years.

In mid 2016, Jung attended Rener Gracie's inaugural Korean Super Seminar in Seoul.

Jung faced Dennis Bermudez on February 4, 2017, at UFC Fight Night 104. He won the fight by knockout in the first round. The win also won Jung his first Performance of the Night bonus award.

Jung was expected to face Ricardo Lamas on July 29, 2017, at UFC 214. However, Jung pulled out of the fight in early June citing a knee injury. He was replaced by Jason Knight.

Jung was expected to face Frankie Edgar on November 10, 2018 at UFC Fight Night 139. However, it was reported on October 26, 2018 that Edgar was pulled from the bout due to injury and he was replaced by Yair Rodríguez. He lost the fight via knockout in the final second of the fifth round. Both participants received Fight of the Night honors.

Jung faced Renato Moicano on June 22, 2019 at UFC on ESPN+ 12. He won the fight via technical knockout in 58 seconds of the first round.  This fight earned him the Performance of the Night award.

Jung was scheduled to face Brian Ortega on December 21, 2019 at UFC on ESPN+ 23.  However, Ortega pulled out of the fight in early December citing a knee injury and he was replaced by Frankie Edgar. Jung won the fight via TKO in the first round. The win also earned Jung a Performance of the Night bonus award.

The bout against Brian Ortega was rescheduled on October 18, 2020 at UFC Fight Night 180. He lost the fight via unanimous decision.

Jung faced Dan Ige on June 19, 2021 at UFC on ESPN 25. He won the fight via unanimous decision. Following the fight, Jung was promoted to the rank of black belt in Brazilian Jiu Jitsu.

Jung challenged for the UFC Featherweight Championship for a second time against Alexander Volkanovski at UFC 273 on April 9, 2022. After being out struck and knocked down multiple times throughout the fight, Jung lost the fight via TKO early in round four.

Championships and accomplishments

Mixed martial arts
Ultimate Fighting Championship
Submission of the Night (Two times) vs. Leonard Garcia and  Dustin Poirier
Knockout of the Night (One time) vs. Mark Hominick
Fight of the Night (Two times) vs. Dustin Poirier and Yair Rodríguez
Performance of the Night (Three times) 
 Tied for second most fight-night bonuses in the UFC Featherweight division history (with Yair Rodríguez)
 First fighter in UFC history to finish with a Twister submission.
World Extreme Cagefighting
Fight of the Night (One time) vs. Leonard Garcia
KoreaFC
Korea FC 65 kg Tournament Winner
Pancrase
Pancrase Korea Neo-Blood Lightweight Tournament Winner
Wrestling Observer Newsletter
2010 Fight of the Year vs. Leonard Garcia on April 24
2012 Fight of the Year vs. Dustin Poirier on May 15
World MMA Awards
2011 Submission of the Year vs. Leonard Garcia at UFC Fight Night: Nogueira vs. Davis
MMAFighting.com
2012 Fight of the Year vs. Dustin Poirier on May 15
ESPN MMA Awards
Fight of the Year (2012) vs. Dustin Poirier on May 15
Bleacher Report
Fight of the Year (2012) vs. Dustin Poirier on May 15
Sherdog
2012 Fight of the Year vs. Dustin Poirier on May 15
2011 All-Violence First Team

Personal life
Jung has two daughters and a son.

Filmography

Television shows

Music video appearances

Mixed martial arts record

|Loss
|align=center|17–7
|Alexander Volkanovski
|TKO (punches)
|UFC 273
|
|align=center|4
|align=center|0:45
|Jacksonville, Florida, United States
|
|-
|Win
|align=center|17–6
|Dan Ige
|Decision (unanimous)
|UFC on ESPN: The Korean Zombie vs. Ige 
|
|align=center|5
|align=center|5:00
|Las Vegas, Nevada, United States
|
|-
|Loss
|align=center|16–6
|Brian Ortega
|Decision (unanimous)
|UFC Fight Night: Ortega vs. The Korean Zombie 
|
|align=center|5
|align=center|5:00
|Abu Dhabi, United Arab Emirates
|  
|-
|Win
|align=center|16–5
|Frankie Edgar
|TKO (punches)
|UFC Fight Night: Edgar vs. The Korean Zombie 
|
|align=center|1
|align=center|3:18
|Busan, South Korea
|
|-
|Win
|align=center|15–5
|Renato Moicano
|TKO (punches)
|UFC Fight Night: Moicano vs. The Korean Zombie 
|
|align=center|1
|align=center|0:58
|Greenville, South Carolina, United States
|
|-
|Loss
|align=center|14–5
|Yair Rodríguez
|KO (elbow)
|UFC Fight Night: The Korean Zombie vs. Rodríguez 
|
|align=center|5
|align=center|4:59
|Denver, Colorado, United States
|
|-
|Win
|align=center|14–4
|Dennis Bermudez
|KO (punch)
|UFC Fight Night: Bermudez vs. The Korean Zombie
|
|align=center|1
|align=center|2:49
|Houston, Texas, United States
|
|-
| Loss
| align=center| 13–4
| José Aldo
| TKO (punches)
| UFC 163
| 
| align=center| 4
| align=center| 2:00
| Rio de Janeiro, Brazil
| 
|-
| Win
| align=center| 13–3
| Dustin Poirier
| Technical Submission (D'Arce choke)
| UFC on Fuel TV: The Korean Zombie vs. Poirier
| 
| align=center| 4
| align=center| 1:07
| Fairfax, Virginia, United States
| 
|-
| Win
| align=center| 12–3
| Mark Hominick
| KO (punches)
| UFC 140
| 
| align=center| 1
| align=center| 0:07
| Toronto, Ontario, Canada
| 
|-
| Win
| align=center| 11–3
| Leonard Garcia
| Submission (twister)
| UFC Fight Night: Nogueira vs. Davis
| 
| align=center| 2
| align=center| 4:59
| Seattle, Washington, United States
| 
|-
| Loss
| align=center| 10–3
| George Roop
| KO (head kick)
| WEC 51
| 
| align=center| 2
| align=center| 1:30
| Broomfield, Colorado, United States
| 
|-
| Loss
| align=center| 10–2
| Leonard Garcia
| Decision (split)
| WEC 48
| 
| align=center| 3
| align=center| 5:00
| Sacramento, California, United States
| 
|-
| Win
| align=center| 10–1
| Matt Jaggers
| Submission (triangle choke)
| World Victory Road Presents: Sengoku 9
| 
| align=center| 2
| align=center| 1:25
| Saitama, Japan
| 
|-
| Loss
| align=center| 9–1
| Masanori Kanehara
| Decision (unanimous)
| World Victory Road Presents: Sengoku 8
| 
| align=center| 3
| align=center| 5:00
| Tokyo, Japan
| 
|-
| Win
| align=center| 9–0
| Shintaro Ishiwatari
| Submission (rear-naked choke)
| World Victory Road Presents: Sengoku 7
| 
| align=center| 1
| align=center| 4:29
| Tokyo, Japan
| 
|-
| Win
| align=center|8–0
| Fanjin Son
| KO (punch)
| Deep: 39 Impact
| 
| align=center| 1
| align=center| 0:17
| Okayama, Japan
| 
|-
| Win
| align=center| 7–0
| Michihiro Omigawa
| Decision (unanimous)
| Deep: Gladiator
| 
| align=center| 2
| align=center| 5:00
| Okayama, Japan
| 
|-
| Win
| align=center| 6–0
| Jung-Hun Cho
| Decision (unanimous)
| rowspan=3|Korea FC
| rowspan=3|
| align=center| 3
| align=center| 5:00
| rowspan=3|Gangwon, South Korea
| 
|-
| Win
| align=center| 5–0
| Dae-Han Choi
| Submission (triangle choke)
| align=center| 1
| align=center| 3:38
| 
|-
| Win
| align=center| 4–0
| Jung-Beom Choi
| Submission (armbar)
| align=center| 1
| align=center| 2:15
| 
|-
| Win
| align=center| 3–0
| Hyung-Geol Lee
| TKO (punches)
| rowspan=2|Pancrase: 2007 Korea Neo-Blood Tournament
| rowspan=2|
| align=center| 1
| align=center| 3:27
| rowspan=2|Busan, South Korea
| 
|-
| Win
| align=center| 2–0
| In-Seok Yoo
| Submission (rear-naked choke)
| align=center| 1
| align=center| 2:34
| 
|-
| Win
| align=center| 1–0
| Hyung-Geol Lee
| Submission (reverse armbar)
| Super Sambo Festival
| 
| align=center| 2
| align=center| 3:07
| Gyeongju, South Korea
|

Awards and nominations

See also
 List of current UFC fighters
 List of male mixed martial artists

References

External links

http://koreanzombiemma.com/

1987 births
Living people
Featherweight mixed martial artists
People from Pohang
South Korean male taekwondo practitioners
South Korean hapkido practitioners
South Korean male kickboxers
South Korean male judoka
South Korean practitioners of Brazilian jiu-jitsu
People awarded a black belt in Brazilian jiu-jitsu
South Korean male mixed martial artists
South Korean sambo practitioners
Mixed martial artists utilizing hapkido
Mixed martial artists utilizing taekwondo
Mixed martial artists utilizing judo
Mixed martial artists utilizing Brazilian jiu-jitsu
Welterweight kickboxers
Ultimate Fighting Championship male fighters
Mixed martial artists utilizing sambo
Sportspeople from North Gyeongsang Province